Sir Henry Crispe (by 1505 – 21 August 1575) was an English landowner and politician.

Family
Henry Crispe was the son of John Crispe of Quex, Birchington, Kent.

Career
In 1544 he fought with the army in France when it captured the port of Boulogne. He was appointed Sheriff of Kent for 1546 and was knighted in 1553.

He was a Member of Parliament (MP) for Dover in March 1553 and of Winchelsea later in that same year. He was returned the member for Canterbury in 1558.

Marriages and issue
Crispe married firstly Katherine Scott, the daughter of Sir John Scott of Scot's Hall in Smeeth, Kent, by whom he had a son, Nicholas.

He married secondly Anne Haselhurst, the daughter and coheir of George Haselhurst, by whom he had four sons and two daughters.

Crispe was succeeded by his second son John, his eldest son, Nicholas, having predeceased him in 1564.

References

1575 deaths
Members of the Parliament of England for Dover
High Sheriffs of Kent
English MPs 1553 (Edward VI)
English MPs 1553 (Mary I)
English MPs 1558
Year of birth uncertain